Pseudopentarthrum is a genus of true weevils in the beetle family Curculionidae. There are about 18 described species in Pseudopentarthrum.

Species
These 18 species belong to the genus Pseudopentarthrum:

 Pseudopentarthrum angustulum Champion & G.C., 1909
 Pseudopentarthrum brevirostre Champion & G.C., 1909
 Pseudopentarthrum caudatum Champion, 1910
 Pseudopentarthrum ferruginipes Hustache, 1932
 Pseudopentarthrum fraternum Blatchley, 1928
 Pseudopentarthrum importatum Hustache & A., 1932
 Pseudopentarthrum importatus Hustache, 1932
 Pseudopentarthrum intermedium Hustache, A., 1932
 Pseudopentarthrum intermedius Hustache, 1932
 Pseudopentarthrum lineifrons Champion & G.C., 1909
 Pseudopentarthrum mexicanum Champion & G.C., 1909
 Pseudopentarthrum parvicollis (Casey, 1892)
 Pseudopentarthrum phloeophagoides Wollaston & T.V., 1873
 Pseudopentarthrum planifrons Champion & G.C., 1909
 Pseudopentarthrum robustum Casey, 1892
 Pseudopentarthrum rubustum Casey
 Pseudopentarthrum simplex Casey, 1892
 Pseudopentarthrum stenoderes Kuschel, 1959

References

Further reading

 
 
 

Cossoninae
Articles created by Qbugbot